The 1933 Pittsburgh Crawfords baseball team competed in Negro National League (NNL) during the 1933 baseball season. The team compiled a 51–36–2 record and won the NNL pennant. 

The team featured seven players who were later inducted into the Baseball Hall of Fame, including player/manager Oscar Charleston; center fielder Cool Papa Bell; catcher Josh Gibson; third baseman Judy Johnson; and pitcher Satchel Paige. 

The team's leading batters were:
 Catcher Josh Gibson - .395 batting average with 18 home runs and 74 RBIs
 Right fielder Ted Page - .356 batting average
 First baseman Oscar Charleston - .335 batting average, 615 slugging percentage, and 66 RBIs
 Center fielder Cool Papa Bell - .302 batting average and 16 stolen bases

The team's leading pitchers were Leroy Matlock (10–6, 3.03 ERA) and Sam Streeter (10–4, 2.25 ERA).

References

1933 in sports in Pennsylvania
Negro league baseball seasons